VSdocman is a documentation generator that allows for code commenting and the automatic generation of technical documentation from C# and VB .NET projects. It is directly integrated in Visual Studio as an extension.

Overview
VSdocman is an extension for Visual Studio 2022, 2019 and 2017. It consists of two main parts - documentation compiler and comment editor. The compiler produces the final class documentation in various formats. The comment editor provides tools for semi-automatic inserting or editing the XML comments that are used by the compiler.

Documentation compiler
Based on user settings, VSdocman scans the code in Visual Studio projects and automatically creates the documentation. This can be done directly from VS UI or from a command line, e.g. in an automated build. The documentation follows the MSDN style with table of contents, index, API class documentation and custom topics, cross-references, search, IntelliSense and F1 context-sensitive help.

Since the compiler has access to the Visual Studio project, it can include also the source code and class diagrams (.cd files) in the documentation. Projects can be documented separately or a single documentation for entire solution can be generated.

The format of output documentation is configurable. The predefined formats are:
 HTML
 CHM (HTML Help)
 Docx
 PDF
 Microsoft Help Viewer
 Microsoft Help 2
 XML

The output can be localized and some languages are already included.

Comment editor
VSdocman can read XML comments from the source code. Editing the comments manually may be a difficult task.
Therefore, it contains WYSIWYG comment editor which helps writing XML comments and custom topics. It is possible to insert tables, lists, pictures, class diagrams, links and other formatting directly into the source code.
Based on the code member type, user can specify the default comment for it. This comment will be automatically added when the user adds or edits the comment for the first time. For example, the "Gets or sets a value indicating whether ..." summary text is automatically generated for boolean properties.

History
Originally, VSdocman was named VBdocman .NET because it evolved from VBdocman. VBdocman .NET only supported Visual Basic .NET. It was renamed to VSdocman after adding support for C# in 2006.

See also
Documentation generator
Comparison of documentation generators
Sandcastle

References

External links
 VSdocman webpage

Documentation generators
Microsoft Visual Studio
.NET programming tools
Microsoft Visual Studio extensions